Hugh Edward "Hughie" Thomasson Jr. (August 13, 1952 – September 9, 2007) was an American guitarist and singer, best known as a founding member of Outlaws. The band found success in the late 1970s and early 1980s with a string of hits. He was also a replacement guitarist for Lynyrd Skynyrd.

Biography
Thomasson wrote many of the songs for the Outlaws, including most of their more popular songs like "Hurry Sundown", "There Goes Another Love Song," and "Green Grass and High Tides". After Outlaws disbanded, Thomasson joined Lynyrd Skynyrd, leaving that band in 2005 to reform Outlaws. Before his death, he contributed to writing of many of Lynyrd Skynyrd's songs on their 2009 album God & Guns, including the single "Still Unbroken."

Thomasson died in his sleep on September 9, 2007, of a heart attack in his home in Brooksville, Florida. He was 55 years old.

References

External links
 "Southern Rock Pioneer Hughie Thomasson Dies in Florida"
 "Guitarist Remembered For Generosity"
 

1952 births
2007 deaths
20th-century American musicians
American male guitarists
American people of Swedish descent
American rock guitarists
Arista Records artists
Lead guitarists
Lynyrd Skynyrd members
Guitarists from Florida
Outlaws (band) members
People from Tampa, Florida
20th-century American guitarists
People from Buchanan, Virginia
20th-century American male musicians